DfI Rivers is an Executive Agency of the Department for Infrastructure (DfI), in the Northern Ireland Executive. It is the statutory drainage and flood defence authority for Northern Ireland under the terms of the Drainage (Northern Ireland) Order 1973.

DfI is the competent authority for the implementation of the EU Floods directive and has delegated the day to day delivery of the directive to DfI Rivers.

The DfI Rivers Headquarters is located in Cookstown and it has Regional headquarters in Lisburn and Omagh and offices in Coleraine, Craigavon and Ballinamallard.

The Strategic Flood Map (NI)  - Rivers & Sea was developed by the DfI Rivers in co-operation with the-then Department of the Environment (DOE). The primary aim of the Strategic Flood Map is to provide an illustration of the areas throughout Northern Ireland that are considered to be at risk of flooding from rivers and the sea. In December 2011 a new version of the map was released that refreshed the information on rivers and the sea, updated the historical information to include the latest flood events and for the first time it included a surface water flood layer.

The Map is designed to:
 Help DfI Rivers and others to plan and manage the work to reduce flood risk.
To encourage people living and working in areas prone to flooding to find out more and take appropriate action. 
Inform anyone who wants to apply for planning permission if flooding is likely to be an important consideration.

References

External links
 DfI Rivers website

Northern Ireland Executive
Water management authorities in the United Kingdom